is the 6th single by Japanese girl group SKE48, and its first under Avex Trax. It debuted at number-one on the weekly Oricon Singles Chart and, as of January 14, 2013 (issue date), has sold 480,916 copies.

Due to restrictions required by Avex, from this single, SKE48 does not release full versions of their music videos, even after the release of the next single (which usually take place through official channels of AKB48 and HKT48 on YouTube). The only exception is "2588 Days" solo single by Rena Matsui, by the time of her graduation, held in August 2015.

Members

"Pareo wa Emerald" 
 Team S: Masana Ōya, Yuria Kizaki, Yukiko Kinoshita, Mizuki Kuwabara, Akari Suda, Kanako Hirmatsu, Jurina Matsui, Rena Matsui, Kumi Yagami
 Team KII: Anna Ishida, Shiori Ogiso, Akane Takayanagi, Sawako Hata, Airi Furukawa, Manatsu Mukaida
 Team E: Kanon Kimoto

"Tokimeki no Ashiato" 
Shirogumi
 Team S: Haruka Ono, Yuuka Nakanishi, Rikako Hirata, Jurina Matsui
 Team KII: Ririna Akaeda, Riho Abiru, Mieko Sato, Rina Matsumoto, Tomoka Wakabayashi
 Team E: Aya Shibata, Yuka Nakamura
 Kenkyuusei: Makiko Saito

"Papa wa Kirai" 
Akagumi
 Team S: Rumi Kato, Shiori Takada, Rena Matsui
 Team KII: Seira Sato, Miki Yakata
 Team E: Kasumi Ueno, Madoka Umemoto, Shiori Kaneko, Mai Takeuchi, Minami Hara, Yukari Yamashita

"Tsumiki no Jikan" 
All SKE48 members at the time of release

"Hanabi wa Owaranai" 
Selection 8
 Team S: Yuria Kizaki, Jurina Matsui, Rena Matsui, Kumi Yagami
 Team KII: Shiori Ogiso, Akane Takayanagi, Manatsu Mukaida
 Team E: Kanon Kimoto

JKT48 Version

On March 27, 2015, JKT48 launched the group's 9th single called "Pareo wa Emerald" (Pareo adalah Emerald)

Promotion and release
This single has the voting tickets for JKT48's 10th single Senbatsu Sosenkyo.

Track listing

Regular edition

Personnel
Melody Laksani is the center performer for the title track. The performers are listed as follows:

Team J: Beby Chaesara Anadila, Devi Kinal Putri, Haruka Nakagawa, Jessica Veranda, Melody Nurramdhani Laksani, Nabilah Ratna Ayu Azalia, Rezky Whiranti Dhike, Shania Junianatha

Team KIII : Cindy Yuvia, Jennifer Hanna, Ratu Vienny Fitrilya, Rona Anggreani, Shinta Naomi, Thalia

Team T : Andela Yuwono, Michelle Christo Kusnadi

References

2011 singles
Japanese-language songs
Songs with lyrics by Yasushi Akimoto
SKE48 songs
Avex Trax singles
Oricon Weekly number-one singles
2011 songs